Barleria albostellata, the grey barleria, is a plant species in the family Acanthaceae. It occurs in subtropical woodland areas of South Africa and Zimbabwe.

External links
Barleria albostellata C.B.Clarke, PlantZAfrica.com

albostellata